Njiru is a neighbourhood in the city of Nairobi.

Location
It was formally part of larger Embakasi division. It borders other neighbourhoods such as Kayole, Ruai, Saika and Mwiki. Electorally, Njiru is placed under Kasarani Constituency; Njiru however, forms part of the larger sub-county of the same name that spans through neighbourhoods as far as from the Outer Ring Road to the farthest east in Kamulu.

Overview
Njiru is generally a low-income to medium-income, mixed-use neighbourhood located in Nairobi's Eastlands area. The neighbourhood exhibits characteristics of a medium-density suburb, having a mix of storey buildings as well single-family dwellings.

Njiru Sub-county
The sub-county borrows its name from the neighbourhood. It borders Embakasi subcounty. It covers eastern to the farthest east area in Nairobi: from Kariobangi South, Dandora, Ruai, Saika, Njiru, parts of Kayole, to Kamulu.

The Sub-county is headed by the sub-county administrator, appointed by a County Public Service Board.

References

Suburbs of Nairobi
Populated places in Nairobi Province